Jonathan Stinson is an American singer and composer of opera. His voice is a baritone.

Education
Dr. Stinson is a graduate of the Oberlin Conservatory of Music, and Indiana University, and University of Cincinnati - College-Conservatory of Music.

Singing career
Dr. Stinson has performed with opera companies and festivals throughout the United States, including Cincinnati Opera, Lyric Opera of Kansas City, Opera Omaha, Dayton Opera, Kentucky Opera, Opera Memphis, Opera New Jersey, Cleveland Opera, Central City Opera, Ohio Light Opera, and the Carmel Bach Festival. Dr. Stinson is currently a professor of voice at the Crane School of Music at SUNY Potsdam.

Composing career
Dr. Stinson's song cycles have been performed in Indiana, Ohio, Massachusetts, Tennessee, Missouri, and Wisconsin.  His first children's opera, The Three Bears, was commissioned by Opera Memphis and premiered in 2007. In 2011, Dr. Stinson's second children's opera, Knightly News, premiered in Chicago by the Chicago Opera Playhouse. During the 2012–2013 season, Atlanta Opera toured Knightly News throughout northern Georgia for 11 weeks.

References

External links
 

Living people
American operatic baritones
American male composers
21st-century American composers
Oberlin Conservatory of Music alumni
Indiana University alumni
University of Cincinnati – College-Conservatory of Music alumni
21st-century American male musicians
Year of birth missing (living people)